Stuart Poucher, a retired British colonel, is today an international electoral expert.  He served in numerous electoral missions in developing countries, usually in the context of United Nations or European Union operations.

His most notable achievement was the organization of the 2004 out-of-country elections for Afghan refugees in Peshawar, Pakistan, which included voter education followed by registration and voting for almost one million refugees from Afghanistan.

References

Election people
Living people
Year of birth missing (living people)
British officials of the United Nations
British humanitarians